Döse (Low German: Döös) the northernmost town in Lower Saxony, Germany at the point where the River Elbe flows into the North Sea. It is a borough of the city Cuxhaven and a popular seaside resort. Döse is located west of Grimmershörn in the borough of Cuxhaven and is one of the tourist centres of the region of Cuxland.

History
Until 1937 Döse, like Cuxhaven, was part of the Land of Hamburg.

Gallery

References

Former municipalities in Lower Saxony
Cuxhaven